Sunset Eyes is an album by saxophonist Teddy Edwards recorded in 1960 and released on the Pacific Jazz label.

Reception

Allmusic reviewer Scott Yanow stated: "Since the great Teddy Edwards never recorded an uninspiring record, this date is easily recommended to fans of straight-ahead jazz".

Track listing 
All compositions by Teddy Edwards except as indicated
 "Tempo de Blues" - 4:46
 "Vintage '57" (Leroy Vinnegar) - 7:12
 "I Hear a Rhapsody" (Jack Baker, George Fragos, Dick Gasparre) - 3:32
 "Up in Teddy's New Flat" - 3:06
 "Sunset Eyes" - 5:26
 "Teddy's Tune" - 6:11
 "Takin' Off" - 6:32
 "The New Symphony Sid" (King Pleasure) - 2:16 Bonus track on CD reissue
 "My Kinda Blues" - 5:11 Bonus track on CD reissue
 "Takin' Off" [First Version] - 2:28 Bonus track on CD reissue
Recorded in Los Angeles on August 16, 1959 (track 1), March 21, 1960 (tracks 3 & 8-10) and August 16, 1960 (tracks 2 & 4-7).

Personnel 
Teddy Edwards - tenor saxophone
Ronnie Ball (track 1), Joe Castro (tracks 2 & 4-7), Amos Trice (tracks 3 & 8-10) - piano
Leroy Vinnegar (tracks 2-10), Ben Tucker (track 1) - bass
Billy Higgins (tracks 2-10), Al Levitt (track 1) - drums

References 

Teddy Edwards albums
1960 albums
Pacific Jazz Records albums